The Out of Control Tour was filmed on 24 May 2009 at London O2 Arena. The release date is 5 October according to the Girls Aloud website and the 13th on Blu-ray. A special version of the DVD will be released only through the Girls Aloud website shop with an audio CD of the performances except the hits medley.

Track list
 "The Promise"
 "No Good Advice"
 "Love Is The Key"
 "Life Got Cold
 "Love Bomb"
 "Biology"
 "Miss You Bow Wow"
 "The Loving Kind"
 "Waiting"
 "Jump"
 "Love Machine"
 "Rolling Back The Rivers In Time"
 "Untouchable"
 "Sexy! No No No..."
 "Broken Strings"
 "Love Is Pain"
 "Wild Horses"
 "Call The Shots"
 "Revolution In The Head"
 "Sound Of The Underground"
 "Fix Me Up"
 "Womanizer"
 "Something Kinda Ooooh"
 Hits Medley: "The Show"/"Wake Me Up"/"Jump"/"No Good Advice"/"Can't Speak French"
 "The Promise" (reprise)

Bonus Features

Videos 
 The Promise (Video)
  The Loving Kind
  Untouchable (New Ending)
  Revolution In The Head Cheryl Girl Cam - Stereo
  Love Machine Nicola Girl Cam - Stereo
  Miss You Bow Wow Sarah Girl Cam - Stereo
  Sound Of The Underground Nadine Girl Cam - Stereo
  Love Is The Key Kimberley Girl Cam - Stereo
  Womanizer (Visuals)
  Love Machine (Visuals)
  Love Is The Key (Visuals)
  Revolution In The Head (Visuals)
  Biology (Visuals)
  Out Of Control (Tour Interview)

Live audio track list
 The Promise
 Love Is The Key
 Biology
 Miss You Bow Wow
 The Loving Kind
 Waiting
 Love Machine
 Rolling Back The Rivers In Time
 Untouchable
 Sexy! No No No...
 Broken Strings
 Love Is Pain
 Call The Shots
 Revolution In The Head
 Sound Of The Underground
 Fix Me Up
 Womanizer
 Something Kinda Ooooh

Cd track listing

Girls Aloud video albums